Jack Tizard CBE (25 February 1919 – 2 August 1979) was a research psychologist, professor of child development, research unit director, international adviser on learning disability and child care, and a president of the British Psychological Society. Tizard was born in New Zealand but spent most of his professional life in England where, as a psychologist, he worked at the boundaries of psychology, medicine, education and the social sciences. His work on alternatives to institutional care in the 1950s and 1960s underpinned the subsequent development of 'ordinary life' models for children and adults with learning disabilities. His later work focused on developing services for young children and their families. Tizard's approach was characterised by a commitment to using high research standards to address important social problems, ensuring through his extensive advisory activities that the results of research were available to practitioners and policy-makers.

Early life and family
Tizard was born on 25 February 1919 in the town of Stratford in the North Island of New Zealand, where his father was a police constable.
 
Tizard's father, John Marsh Tizard, was born in 1885 in the small mining township of Cromwell on the South Island of New Zealand. In 1910, John married Lionelle Washington Ward and commenced training with the police. His father had died in 1908 and in 1913 his mother Emma, Jack's grandmother, moved with most of her ten children, of whom John was the oldest surviving son, to Timaru, where worked as a policeman in Timaru until being transferred to Stratford in 1916.

Tizard's parents both contracted tuberculosis. In 1920 the family moved to Tokaanu, a village near Lake Taupō where there were hot springs beneficial to health. Lionelle died there in 1922, aged 33, when Tizard was three years old. After her death, John Tizard and his three children moved back to Timaru to live with the family of Jack's grandmother, Emma. John Tizard died in 1924 aged 39. Jack Tizard and his two sisters were brought up by their grandmother and six aunts. Also in the household were three other orphaned grandchildren of Emma.

Tizard's later childhood was lived through the global depression and the family suffered a degree of poverty. Tizard attended Timaru Boys' High School. His grandmother Emma died in 1935, at age 79, when Tizard was 16. He obtained a scholarship to Canterbury University College of the University of New Zealand in Christchurch where he chose the subjects of psychology and philosophy. He was fortunate to have as a philosophy lecturer the renowned philosopher of logic and scientific method, Karl Popper, who had moved to New Zealand in 1937 after the Nazis came to power in his native Austria. Jack was very strongly influenced in his later commitment to scientific methodology by Karl Popper. Popper described Tizard as 'the best student I had in New Zealand'.

Tizard obtained a first class degree in 1940 and was given the award of the University of New Zealand's Senior Scholar in Philosophy.

War service
World War II broke out before Tizard completed his studies. As a pacifist, he volunteered as a member of the Medical Corps for the Second New Zealand Expeditionary Force. He spent five years in the field ambulance service in Greece, North Africa and Italy, as a medical orderly and stretcher bearer. He was involved in the major battles of El Alamein and Monte Cassino.

Move to the United Kingdom
At the end of the war, Tizard took up an award he had been granted to study for a PhD at Oxford University. He travelled to the United Kingdom in December 1945. The subject he chose was social history. Jack did not like life in Oxford, including the elitism and snobbishness associated with the university. He did, though, fall in love with an undergraduate, Barbara Parker (1926-2015) and they married in December 1947. To escape Oxford and earn some money, Jack spent a short time as a part-time teacher of logic with his former teacher, Karl Popper, who had been appointed Reader (and later Professor) of Logic and Scientific Method at the London School of Economics. He then took a post as psychology lecturer at St Andrews University. Preferring research to teaching, through contacts in the British Psychological Society Jack was recommended to the psychiatrist Aubrey Lewis who was setting up a new research unit at the Maudsley Hospital in London, funded by the Medical Research Council. This was called the Occupational Adaptation Unit, later changed to the Social Psychiatry Unit. Jack began work there in April 1948. He had continued his studies at Oxford University, but downgraded his degree there from PhD to BLitt, which he was awarded in 1948. He registered for a PhD at London University which he was awarded in 1951.

Jack's initial brief, together with his colleague Neil O'Connor, was to research the occupational potential of people with learning disabilities (then called 'mental deficiency' and later 'mental handicap', terms that are now outdated).

Politics
At university, Jack was a member of the Radical Club and campaigned as a student for university education to be free and for the system to be less exam-bound and more relevant to real world problems.
 
Jack's family experiences had reinforced a belief in the need for government action on social issues and he developed a lifelong commitment to Socialism. During Jack's undergraduate years he had also joined the university Socialist Society and the power of Socialist ideas and policy were confirmed when the New Zealand government passed the Social Security Act 1938, covering unemployment benefit, pensions and universal health care, the first example in the world of comprehensive Welfare State provision. Jack's war experience was of mixing with fellow soldiers from a very wide variety of backgrounds, reinforcing his distaste for class differences and class prejudice.

Jack's wife Barbara had joined the Communist Party as an undergraduate and Jack also joined. He was a member from 1947 to 1956, when they left the party after the Soviet invasion of Hungary. Later, Jack's former membership of the Communist Party caused him some problems in gaining visas to visit America, but because of his high reputation there these were eventually overcome. He remained a lifelong Socialist and from 1956 a member of the Labour Party.

In the mid-20th century, large numbers of people with learning disabilities were detained in institutions with little legal protection in the UK, under the 1913 Mental Deficiency Act. An organisation campaigning about the plight of people with learning disabilities detained under the 1913 Act was the National Council for Civil Liberties. Jack supported this campaign and wrote several articles which fed into the Royal Commission on the Law Relating to Mental Illness and Mental Deficiency. This reported in 1957 and led to the passing of the 1959 Mental Health Act which completely reformed the 1913 Act.

One of Jack's major achievements was to link high quality scientific research to political agendas for change, particularly from a Socialist perspective. This was evident in his research work right from the start. His Socialism informed his use of research data in his advisory work, his choice of research topics and his criticism of the triviality of much psychological and sociological research.

Output
Jack remained at the Social Psychiatry Research Unit from 1948 to 1964 when he was appointed Professor of Child Development at the Institute of Education, University of London. In 1973 he founded the Thomas Coram Research Unit, still under the Institute of Education, and changed his role to become Director. He remained there until his early death in 1979. During these 31 years, Jack published ten books, 74 articles in scientific journals, and 27 chapters in edited books. He also gave numerous conference papers and authored several government reports.

The Social Problem of Mental Deficiency
Between 1948 and 1956 Jack, together with his colleague Neil O'Connor, worked on demonstrating the ability of adults with learning disabilities to learn industrial tasks and hence to improve their possibilities of obtaining work. This initially focused on the more able people, but later extended to those with a severe degree of learning disability. Around a dozen articles on this work were published in scientific journals, including the American Journal of Mental Deficiency, thus ensuring that Jack's work became well known in the USA.
 
In 1956 the research was brought together in a book with the title The Social Problem of Mental Deficiency. If a book with that title had been published in the first half of the 20th century it would almost certainly have reflected the agenda of the Eugenics Movement: the belief that social problems such as poverty, unemployment and criminality result from learning disabilities being inherited through families, and that the solution lies in programmes of sterilisation, incarceration or even extermination. Jack and Neil's approach was very different. They believed, and demonstrated, that people with learning disabilities could be taught skills and that they could carry out work and did not need to be detained in institutions.

Epidemiological approaches
Jack had also developed a principle that research work should be underpinned by surveys of the extent and nature of problems – an epidemiological approach. In the early 1950s he published several studies of the prevalence and characteristics of people with learning difficulties. He also embarked, with Jacqueline Grad, on a study of 250 families with a member with learning disabilities. In 1962 he published a major study, with Nancy Goodman, of the prevalence of learning disability amongst children. Both the Wessex Project and the Isle of Wight Study, described below, rested on large epidemiological surveys. Jack's emerging research strategy was to identify issues through comprehensive surveys, and then set up model services to address the issues and evaluate their outcomes.

The Brooklands Experiment
Apart from the early promotion of workshops for training and employment of adults with learning disabilities, the first model service set up and evaluated by Jack was the Brooklands experiment. Brooklands was a big house at Reigate in Surrey. A group of 16 children were moved there from the Fountain Hospital in London, a large institution for children and adults with learning disabilities. The smaller scale care at Brooklands was organised on developmental rather than custodial principles, on similar lines to that provided for children without disabilities who were unable to live with their parents, and the progress of the children was compared with that of a matched group of children who remained in the hospital. The Brooklands children showed greater development especially in the areas of speech and verbal intelligence.

Community Services for the Mentally Handicapped
Probably the most influential work in the whole of Jack's career was the book Community Services for the Mentally Handicapped, published in 1964. This outlined the research findings on employability, on the benefits of small scale care and on the needs of families. On the basis of this research he put forward a blueprint for a comprehensive system of care for people with learning disabilities based in their local communities: 'community care' that could meet their needs in a more humane and successful way. The book pioneered the thinking that would lead eventually to the closure of nearly all institutional care for people with learning disabilities in the UK and their replacement with small-scale, developmentally oriented local services. Jack's ideas were also put forward in an influential publication by the President's Commission on Mental Retardation in 1969, ensuring their influence in the USA as well.

The Wessex Project
In 1962 Jack negotiated substantial long-term funding from the Department of Health for an ambitious project based on his research strategy. A doctor with experience of epidemiology and care of people with learning disabilities, Albert Kushlick, was appointed to develop and lead this project, working from the Wessex Regional Hospital Board in Winchester. The first step was to carry out a comprehensive epidemiological survey of people with learning disabilities in the population of 2 million people served by the Wessex Board. This enabled cohorts of children, and later severely disabled adults, from smaller population areas to be identified and moved from large hospitals to 'locally based hospital units' (LBHUs), homes of 20 places with a developmental rather than custodial emphasis situated within the areas close to their families. The feasibility of such services, and the outcomes for residents and families, would be evaluated.

The LBHUs were successfully set up and served their residents for several years, demonstrating the feasibility of this kind of service. Measurement of outcomes showed benefit to residents. Later, members of the research team turned their attention to the feasibility of providing care in very small groups in ordinary housing.
 
The Wessex project fed in to several parallel political and professional developments. Politically, a number of scandals of ill-treatment of people in large hospitals led to highly critical public inquiries, and in 1971 a government White Paper, Better Services for the Mentally Handicapped, recommended a reduction of half in the number of places in hospitals and their replacement by community-based facilities. Professionally, the philosophy of 'normalisation', providing services that give people experiences as close as possible to those generally valued in ordinary society, had gained much support in Scandinavia, the USA, the UK and other countries.

The Child Welfare Project
In parallel with the Wessex Project, Jack had initiated and secured funding for a study of management practices in different kinds of residential provision for children, with a focus on those with learning disabilities. These studies were published in the book Patterns of Residential Care in 1971. This documented in detail the findings from 16 residential services on measures of management practice. Children's homes and local authority hostels were found to operate in a more child-centred and beneficial way than long-stay hospitals. The book included recommendations for improved practice in all residential services.

The Isle of Wight Studies
In collaboration with the child psychiatrist Michael Rutter and a senior medical officer at the Department of Health, Kingsley Whitmore, Jack had also initiated and negotiated funding for a major study of disability amongst a complete cohort of children aged 9 to 12 years on the Isle of Wight. In the total population of the island of around 100,000 people there were 3,500 children in this age range. The collaborative project demonstrated another key feature of Jack's research, the bringing together of different fields and disciplines in the study of social issues. The work was reported in a 400-page book Education, Health and Behaviour (1970), with Jack as co-editor. The main surveys were carried out in 1964 and 1965 though follow-up work continued for another ten years. The extent of intellectual or educational disability, psychiatric disorder and physical disability was assessed. It was found that one in six children had a degree of one or more of these issues sufficient to entail 'considerable interference with their ability to lead a normal life'. The final chapter of the book discussed implications for effective service provision. In 1998 to 2000 there was a further follow-up of some of the children into mid-life, with a focus on literacy and mental health.

The Institute of Education and widening interests
In 1964 a Chair in Child Development was established at the Institute of Education, University of London, funded by the charity then called The Spastics Society (now called Scope). The post was offered to Jack who became Professor of Child Development. His brief was to develop research as well as teaching activities that would still have an emphasis on disability but would also offer opportunities for the study of wider issues affecting children. Jack had already been involved in an epidemiological study of delinquency and maladjustment in children.

As well as continuing his involvement in the projects he had already initiated, during his time as Professor at the Institute of Education Jack widened his research interests. For example, in 1971 with his wife Barbara, he carried out a study of two-year-old children in residential nurseries, and in 1972 he spent three weeks in Jamaica, again with Barbara, studying the effects of malnutrition on child development and giving a conference paper on the topic. He expanded his advisory work and published articles on a wide range of topics as well as overseeing many research projects carried out by colleagues and students.

Thomas Coram Research Unit
In the early 1970s Jack negotiated with the Department of Health for long-term funding of a unit dedicated solely to research projects that could be coordinated and would ensure the building up of multi-disciplinary expertise. The Thomas Coram Research Unit (TCRU), again under the auspices of the Institute of Education, was established in 1973 with Jack as Director. Between then and Jack's death in 1979 the number of researchers increased from 18 to 37, with funding from ten different agencies. The unit continued with studies of children, and in some cases adults, with learning and other disabilities but greatly expanded studies of children in families, in foster care, in nurseries, in pre-school education and in residential care

In 1975 Jack, with Ian Sinclair and Ronald Clarke, edited the book Varieties of Residential Experience, a collection of studies of different kinds of residential care for children and young people. This described different patterns of care and their effects on residents in homes for children with learning disabilities, residential nurseries, approved schools, probation hostels, other 'correctional' units and homes for autistic children. Recommendations were made for improved care.

A priority for Jack on establishing TCRU was services for young children and their families, which he thought in urgent need of reform. He applied to them his research strategy, including surveys of the conditions and needs of families and the establishment and evaluation of a model service, in this case multi-purpose Children's Centres available to all families in their catchment areas, with two such Centres set up in inner city areas of London. Although ignored by government at the time, Children's Centres were to become a flagship policy of the new Labour government 30 years later. Jack, together with Peter Moss and Jane Perry, set out his ideas on early childhood services in the 1976 book All Our Children, including a central role for Children's Centres. All Our Children also highlighted Jack's concerns about childminding: that it was characterised by little research, few resources, a lack of training and ineffective regulation. He therefore initiated a major research study on this topic.
 
Jack was not afraid to challenge government policy. For example, in 1976 he gave a powerful rebuttal to the notion that services for young children and their families could and should be provided cheaply, at a conference with the title 'Low Cost Day Provision for Under Fives' organised by the Department of Health and Social Security. At the time of his death, Jack was working on a project on the involvement of parents in helping their children's reading ability. His reports of this work were published posthumously.

Links between projects
A theme throughout Jack's career was the linking of projects together to enhance the findings and better inform policy implications. In his influential book Community Care for the Mentally Handicapped, work on training and employment, on the needs of families and on residential care were brought together. There was much cross-fertilisation of ideas between the Brooklands experiment, the Wessex Project, the Child Welfare Project and later the Varieties of Residential Experience project. Many of the projects Jack initiated at the Institute of Education were linked, as were most of those at the Thomas Coram Research Unit. A clear rationale for this linkage was given in a report to the Chief Scientist at the Department of Health and Social Security in the year of Jack's death. He also argues for support for research across government departments (e.g. Health and Education) and across government research councils (e.g. Medical and Social Science Councils), rather than the pursuit of sectional interests.

Controversies – Jensen and Burt
Jack was sceptical of genetic explanations of human differences and in the 1970s he got involved in two related controversies on this topic.

The American professor Arthur Jensen had argued for a genetic basis for black people measuring on average lower than white people on intelligence tests. In a highly critical article Jack challenged the statistical basis of Jensen's work, and also went further in arguing that centuries of oppression are likely to have influenced the performance of black people on tests and that Jensen's research question represented "from a scientific point of view a pseudo-problem".

Cyril Burt was a British psychologist whom Jack had previously greatly admired. He had published studies of identical twins reared apart, in order to work out the relative influence of genetics or environment on their development. Jack was among a number of people who became suspicious that Burt had faked at least some of his data, and he investigated and wrote about this, particularly discovering that co-workers that Burt had claimed he worked with on the twin studies did not exist.

Advisory work
The high quality and pioneer nature of Jack's research led to him being invited to join or contribute to many advisory and policy bodies. Jack always welcomed these opportunities to try to ensure that decisions were taken on the basis of good evidence rather than polemic. Much of this involvement was time-consuming and often unpaid. It also entailed travel to many countries outside the UK.

Jack was a consultant on learning disability to the World Health Organisation and also to the Centre for Educational Research and Innovation, a branch of the Organisation for Economic Cooperation and Development. For the UK Department of Health he was adviser on learning disability, a member of the Chief Scientist's Research Committee, Chair of the Advisory Committee on Handicapped Children, and a member of the Court Committee on Child Health Services. He was a member of the Social Science Research Council and Chair of its Educational Board. He was adviser to the Home Office Research Unit. He was a Fellow of the British Psychological Society, an honorary member of the British Paediatric Association, a Fellow of the Royal Society of Medicine, and a member of and adviser on learning disability to the Association for Child Psychology and Psychiatry (now called the Association for Child and Adolescent Mental Health). He was one of the first to join the Society for Social Medicine on its founding in 1956.

In 1975-6, Jack was President of the British Psychological Society.

Awards and memorials
Jack was granted two prestigious American awards for his work on learning disability. In 1968, jointly with Neil O'Connor, he received the Kennedy Foundation International Award for Scientific Research in Mental Retardation, and in 1973 the Research Award of the American Association on Mental Deficiency (now the American Association on Intellectual and Developmental Disabilities). Also in 1973 he was awarded a CBE in the Queen's Honours List. His socialist principles caused him to consider refusing this, but he decided it would help him to influence policy and gain research grants.

He was very successful in achieving the award of large grants for major research projects, from the Department of Health, the Medical Research Council, and some American organisations such as the Association for the Aid of Crippled Children (now called the Foundation for Child Development). After his death, a Memorial Fund was set up by his colleagues. It helped to fund a memorial volume of key articles by Jack, published by the British Psychological Society, edited by Alan Clarke and Jack's wife Barbara. In memory of Jack a special school in London was named the Jack Tizard School, a research unit at Kent University was named the Tizard Centre, and a Tizard Memorial Lecture was established by the Association for Child and Adolescent Mental Health which is still given annually.

Family and early death
Jack and Barbara had five children: Bill, John, Jenny, Martin and Lucy.

In December 1978, after increasing pain and weight loss, Jack was diagnosed with inoperable stomach cancer. He died on 2 August 1979. He was 60 years old. He had continued to go into work until a month before his death. Barbara wrote a moving account of this period. A renowned researcher in her own right, she was appointed to succeed Jack as Director of the Thomas Coram Research Unit.

Personal qualities
Jack possessed a very effective combination of a likeable personality and great persuasiveness.

Barbara wrote of him: "Despite his radical ideas on social policy, he was widely respected in Establishment circles. This was in part because of the powerful charisma which he developed over the years; the qualities which contributed to this…included the exceptional warmth and generosity with which he responded to almost everyone he met, a steadiness of character and deep moral conviction combined with wit and high intelligence".

His colleagues wrote of him: "In committee, as everywhere else, he showed courtesy, loyalty, total honesty and integrity, and combined these with continuous clarity of thought. Although honoured and internationally regarded he never appeared pompous. Above all he was an exceptionally nice man, backed by a stable, close and rewarding marriage, a man with whom it was a pleasure and a privilege to collaborate, and one who worked hard and conscientiously to the end".

Legacy
As soon as Jack was introduced to people with learning disabilities in 1948 he realised that services for them were inadequate. He set out to influence policy, not by polemic or anecdote but by high quality science. He developed the effective three-fold strategy of surveying need, establishing model services and evaluating outcomes. His studies generated advice which he disseminated widely through gaining an international reputation as innovator, thinker and researcher. Jack's major contribution to psychology was to demonstrate that psychological research could be allied to social policy and so become more powerful and relevant. This was an important revelation to many students beginning their careers in psychology and research in the 1950s, 60s and 70s.

The American writer on leadership, John Maxwell, has said: "A leader is great, not because of his or her power, but because of his or her ability to empower others". One of Jack's strengths was his ability to initiate and negotiate funding for research projects, but then to empower others to develop the project and report the findings. Among those benefiting from Jack's generosity in this respect were J G Lyle in the Brooklands project, Albert Kushlick in the Wessex project, Michael Rutter in the Isle of Wight study, Roy King and Norma Raynes in the Child Welfare Project, Berry Mayall and Pat Petrie in the childminding project at TCRU, and many more. Many of Jack's students and colleagues went on to pursue further psychological or sociological research to influence policy and improve service quality. In the field of learning disability alone, researchers who had worked on Jack's projects became Founders or Directors (or both) of the Hester Adrian Research Centre at the University of Manchester, the Mental Handicap in Wales Applied Research Unit at Cardiff University, the British Institute of Learning Disability, the Learning Disability Team at the King's Fund Centre in London and the Tizard Centre at the University of Kent. In wider fields, many went on to hold Professorships and research posts at universities in education, psychology, psychiatry, sociology and criminology, studying a wide range of aspects of social policy, especially in relation to children. The Thomas Coram Research Unit, established by Jack in 1973, continues its work to the present day.

References 

1919 births
1979 deaths
New Zealand psychologists
Commanders of the Order of the British Empire
Presidents of the British Psychological Society
People involved with mental health
20th-century psychologists
New Zealand emigrants to the United Kingdom